Poonthalir is a 1979 Indian Tamil-language film, directed by Devaraj–Mohan, starring Sivakumar and Sujatha. The music was scored by Ilaiyaraaja. The film was a remake of Hindi film Aakhri Khat (1966). The film, Sivakumar's 101st as an actor, was a success.

Plot 
Ashok (Sivakumar), an artist/sculptor, falls in love with and marries Maya, a poor Keralite woman (Sujatha), but they become separated when Ashok leaves for a prolonged assignment in the USA. When he comes back after a few years and looks for his wife, he receives a letter from her that conveys a strange message to him and he soon finds out that she has died due to a terminal illness and that their child (master Anand) has gone missing. He then starts a desperate search for this lost child with the help of a dedicated police officer and whether he succeeds in his quest forms the rest of the story.

Cast 
Sivakumar
Sujatha
Master Anand
Suruli Rajan
Manorama

Production
Poonthalir was Sivakumar's 101st film an actor.

Soundtrack 
The music was composed by Ilaiyaraaja.

References

External links 
 

1970s Tamil-language films
1978 films
Films about babies
Films scored by Ilaiyaraaja
Indian drama films
Tamil remakes of Hindi films